The 13th IFTA Film & Drama Awards took place at the Mansion House on 9 April 2016 in Dublin, honouring Irish film and television released in 2015. Deirdre O'Kane hosted the film awards ceremony.

Film Awards
The nominations for the IFTA Film & Drama Awards were announced on 14 March 2016.

Film categories
 Best Film
Brooklyn
My Name Is Emily
 Room
Sing Street
The Survivalist
Viva

 Director in Film
Lenny Abrahamson - Room
Paddy Breathnach - Viva
John Carney - Sing Street
John Crowley - Brooklyn
Stephen Fingleton - The Survivalist

 Script Film
John Carney - Sing Street
Emma Donoghue - Room
Simon Fitzmaurice - My Name Is Emily
Mark O'Halloran - Viva
Johnny O'Reilly - Moscow Never Sleeps

 Actor in a Lead Role in a Feature Film
Colin Farrell - The Lobster
Michael Fassbender - Steve Jobs
Domhnall Gleeson - Ex Machina
Barry Keoghan - Mammal
Martin McCann - The Survivalist

 Actress in a Lead Role in a Feature Film
Eva Birthistle - Swansong
Ruth Bradley - Pursuit
Orla Brady - The Price of Desire
Evanna Lynch - My Name Is Emily
Saoirse Ronan - Brooklyn

 Actor in a Supporting Role in a Feature Film
Sean T. Ó Meallaigh - The Callback Queen
Jack Reynor - Sing Street
Domhnall Gleeson - Brooklyn
Owen Roe - Pursuit
Michael Smiley - My Name Is Emily

 Actress in a Supporting Role in a Feature Film
Jane Brennan - Brooklyn
Gemma-Leah Devereux -  Get Up and Go
Olwen Fouéré - The Survivalist
Siobhan O'Kelly - An Klondike
Ger Ryan - The Callback Queen

 George Morrison Feature Documentary 
A Doctor's Sword - Bob Jackson and Gary Lennon
The Land of the Enlightened - Morgan Bushe and Bart Van Langendonck
Mom and Me - Ken Wardrop
Older Than Ireland - Alex Fegan, Garry Walsh and Colm Nicell
The Queen of Ireland - Ailish Bracken, Katie Holly and Conor Horgan

 Short Film
Change in the Weather
Ernestine and Kit
The Great Wide Open
How Was Your Day?
Love is a Sting
Stutterer

 Animation
A Coat Made Dark - Jack O'Shea
Geist - Daniel Spencer
Tea with the Dead - Susan Broe
Unhinged - Tom Caulfield

International categories
 International Film sponsored by American Airlines
The Revenant
Spotlight
 Mad Max: Fury Road
Ex Machina

 International Actor
Matt Damon -  The Martian
Leonardo DiCaprio - The Revenant
 Jacob Tremblay -  Room
Bryan Cranston - Trumbo

 International Actress
 Brie Larson -  Room
Cate Blanchett -Carol
Rachel Griffiths -  Mammal
Charlotte Rampling - 45 Years

Television Drama categories
Best Drama 
 An Klondike
 Game of Thrones
 Penny Dreadful
 Rebellion
 Vikings

Director Drama
 Anthony Byrne  - Ripper Street
 Neasa Hardiman - Happy Valley
 Daithí Keane - An Klondike
 Brian Kirk -  Penny Dreadful
 Aisling Walsh -  An Inspector Calls

Script Drama
 Marcus Fleming - An Klondike
 Lisa McGee - Indian Summers
 Billy Roche - Clean Break
 Colin Teevan - Rebellion

Actor in a Lead Role in Drama
 Barry Ward - Rebellion
 Dara Devaney - An Klondike
 Colin Farrell - True Detective
 Aidan Turner - Poldark
 Stephen Rea - Dickensian

Actress in a Lead Role Drama
 Caitriona Balfe - Outlander
 Ruth Bradley - Rebellion
 Elaine Cassidy - No Offence
 Sarah Greene - Rebellion
 Catherine Walker - Critical

Actor in a Supporting Role in Drama
 Ned Dennehy - Dickensian
 Liam Cunningham - Game of Thrones
 Moe Dunford - Vikings
 Robert O'Mahoney - An Klondike
 Stephen Rea - War and Peace

Actress in a Supporting Role in Drama
 Michelle Fairley - Rebellion
 Sarah Greene - Penny Dreadful
 Paula Malcomson - Ray Donovan
 Ruth Negga  - Agents of S.H.I.E.L.D.
 Victoria Smurfit  - Once Upon a Time

References

External links
2016 Nominations
Official Site

2016 in Irish television
13
2016 film awards
2016 television awards